These lists include all members of the Council of the District of Columbia since its creation in 1975. All members are elected to 4-year terms (except for the initial 2-year terms for half the members elected to the first council, in 1974).

Commissioner-council system
On June 1, 1967, President Lyndon B. Johnson ordered that the 3-member commissioner system that had governed the District for nearly 100 years be replaced by a single commissioner and a 9-member city council all appointed by the President. The commissioner, sometimes referred to as the mayor-commissioner, would be able to veto the actions of the council, and council could overrule the veto with a 3/4ths majority. Congress had 60 days for either house to reject the rule. Only the House introduced a disapproval resolution, supported by Republicans and Southern Democrats, but it failed 244–160. Each member of the council served a 3-year term starting February 1, with seats staggered by three years; except for those appointed initially in 1967. In the event that a member's term expired, they would remain a member until a replacement was confirmed and sworn in. By law, a maximum of six members could be from any one party.

Because of a low salary and the fact that terms lasted until a replacement was available, membership was quite fluid. (Changes in italics)

Nov 3, 1967 – Sept 13, 1968 – John W. Heckiner (Chair), Walter E. Fauntroy (vice-chair), Stanley J. Anderson, Margaret A. Haywood, John A. Nevius, Polly Shackleton, William S. Thompson, J.C. Turner, Joseph P. Yeldell. (Haywood, Turner and Yelldell had terms that ended on Feb 1, 1968, but all three were reappointed.)
Sept 13, 1968 – Oct 18, 1968 – Heckiner (Chair), Fauntroy (vice-chair), Anderson, Haywood, Nevius, Shackleton, Thompson, Yeldell. (Turner resigned.)
Oct 18, 1968 – March 13, 1969 – Heckiner (Chair), Fauntroy (vice-chair), Anderson, Haywood, Nevius, Shackleton, Thompson, Phillip J. Daugherty and Yeldell. (Daugherty was appointed to fill Turner's seat.)
March 13, 1969 – July 11, 1969 – Gilbert Hahn, Jr (Chair), Sterling Tucker (vice-chair), Anderson, Haywood, Rev. Jerry A Moore, Jr., Shackleton, Thompson,  Daugherty and Yeldell. (Hahn, Tucker and Moore replaced Hechinger, Fauntroy and Nevius respectively; Nixon's first appointments as he shifted the council from majority Democrat to majority Republican.)
July 11, 1969 – Oct 16, 1969 – Hahn (Chair), Tucker (vice-chair), Anderson, Haywood, Shackleton, Moore, Daugherty and Yeldell. (Thompson resigned to be a judge.)
Oct 16, 1969 – April 3, 1970 – Hahn (Chair), Tucker (vice-chair), Anderson, Haywood, Shackleton, Moore, Dr. Henry S. Robinson, Daugherty and Yeldell. (Robinson appointed to fill Thompson's seat.)
April 3, 1970 – Nov 30, 1970 – Hahn (Chair), Tucker (vice-chair), Anderson, Haywood, Rev. Carlton W. Veazey, Moore, Robinson, Daugherty and Yeldell. (Anderson and Robinson were reappointed and Veazey replaced Shackleton.)
Nov 30, 1970 – June 22, 1971 – Hahn (Chair), Tucker (vice-chair), Anderson, Haywood, Veazey, Moore, Robinson and Daugherty. (Yeldell resigned to run for delegate.)
June 22, 1971 – Nov 30, 1971 – Hahn (Chair), Tucker (vice-chair), Anderson, Haywood, Veazey, Moore, Robinson, Henry K. Willard II and Yeldell. (Haywood  was reappointed, Yeldell was appointed to his own vacancy and Willard replaced Daugherty.) 
Nov 30, 1971 – Jan 17, 1972 – Hahn (Chair), Tucker (vice-chair), Anderson, Haywood, Veazey, Moore, Robinson, Willard. (Yeldell resigned to become the city's human resources director.)
Jan 17, 1972 – March 18, 1972  – Hahn (Chair), Tucker (vice-chair), Anderson, Haywood, Veazey, Moore, Robinson, Willard and Tedson J. Meyers (Meyers appointed to fill Yeldell's seat.) 
March 18, 1972 – May 3, 1972 – Hahn (Chair),  Tucker (vice-chair), Anderson, Haywood, Veazey, Robinson, Willard and Meyers. (Moore resigned to run for delegate.)
May 3, 1972 – June 20, 1972 – Nevius (Chair), Tucker (vice-chair), Anderson, Haywood, Veazey, Robinson, Willard and Meyers. (Nevius appointed to replace Hahn as chair.)
June 20, 1972 – July 11, 1972 – Nevius (Chair), Tucker (vice-chair), Anderson, Haywood, Veazey, Robinson and Meyers. (Willard retired to focus on business.)
July 11, 1972 – Oct 2, 1972 – Nevius (Chair), Tucker (vice-chair), Anderson, Veazey, Robinson and Meyers. (Haywood resigned to become a judge.)
Oct 2, 1972 – Aug 8, 1973 – Nevius (Chair), Tucker (vice-chair), Anderson, Marjorie Parker, Veazey, Moore, Robinson, Rockwood H. Foster and Meyers. (Foster replaced Willard, Parker replaced Haywood and Moore reappointed to the seat he vacated.)
Aug 8, 1973 – Jan 2, 1975 – Nevius (Chair), Tucker (vice-chair), Marguerite C. Selden, Parker, Antoinette Ford, Moore, Robinson, Foster and Meyers. (Selden replaced Anderson, Ford replaced Veazey and Robinson was reappointed.)

On October 30, 1973, members voted to represent areas of town. They did not use the ward system, which had been created for the school board, but instead used the service area system created by the mayor in 1970. There were 8 wards, 9 service areas and 9 members of the council. They were assigned: 
Service area 1 (upper Ga Ave Corridor) – Moore
Service area 2 (upper NE) – Robinson
Service area 3 (NE, east of Anacostia) – Parker
Service area 4 (SE east of Anacostia) – Ford 
Service area 5 (Capitol Hill and just east of Anacostia River) – Selden
Service area 6 (Model citys, Ivy City, Stanton Park and Trinidad) – Tucker 
Service area 7 (Adams Morgan) – Tucker 
Service area 8 (west of Rock Creek park) – Foster 
Service area 9 (downtown and SW) – Meyers and Parker

Appointed members and tenure

Tenure records
The chairman who served the longest uninterrupted period of time is Linda A. Cropp, who served 9 years, 146 days, from August 8, 1997, to January 1, 2007. David A. Clarke served the longest as chairman, counting all terms (with interruptions), serving 10 years, 185 days (from January 3, 1983, to January 3, 1991, and again from September 27, 1993, to his death on March 28, 1997). The chairman who served the shortest period of time is Kwame R. Brown, who served 521 days from January 2, 2011, to June 6, 2012.

The council member who served the longest uninterrupted period of time is Jack Evans, who served 28 years from May 13, 1991, to January 17, 2020. Evans also holds the record for serving the longest period of time counting interrupted service. The council member who served the shortest period of time is Arrington Dixon, who served 121 days between his special appointment to an at-large seat on August 15, 1997, and December 14, 1997 (when David Catania was sworn in after winning a special election on December 3, 1997).

The at-large council member who served the longest uninterrupted period of time is Hilda Mason, who served 21 years, 273 days from April 2, 1977, to January 1, 1999. Mason also holds the record for serving the longest period of time counting interrupted service. The Group 1 at-large council member who served the longest uninterrupted period of time is John L. Ray, who served 17 years, 359 days from January 8, 1979, to January 1, 1997. Ray also holds the record for the Group 1 at-large council member serving the longest period of time counting interrupted service. The Group 1 at-large council member who served the shortest period of time is Arrington Dixon. The Group 2 at-large council member who served the longest uninterrupted period of time is Hilda Mason. Mason also holds the record for the Group 2 at-large council member serving the longest period of time counting interrupted service. The Group 1 at-large council member who served the shortest period of time is Sekou Biddle, who served 123 days from his appointment on January 7, 2011, until May 9, 2011 (his successor, Vincent Orange, was sworn in on May 10 after a special election held April 26, 2011).

Chairman
 Sterling Tucker (D), 1975–1979
 Arrington Dixon (D), 1979–1983
 David A. Clarke (D), 1983–1991
 John A. Wilson (D), 1991–1993
 David A. Clarke (D), 1993–1997 (won special election after death of Wilson)
 Linda W. Cropp (D), 1997–2007 (won special election after death of Clarke)
 Vincent C. Gray (D), 2007–2011
 Kwame R. Brown (D), 2011–2012
 Phil Mendelson (D), 2012–present (won special election after Brown resigned)

At-large member
There are four at-large members at any time, elected in groups of two. Group 1 was elected in 1974 to 2-year terms and elected in years divisible by 4 thereafter: 1976, 1980, ..., 2008, 2012, etc. Group 2 is elected in years divisible by 2 but not by 4: 1974, 1978, ..., 2010, 2014, etc. In 1974, Group 1 consisted of Marion Barry and Jerry A. Moore, Jr.

 Douglas E. Moore (D), 1975–1979
 Julius Hobson (Statehood), 1975–1977
 Marion Barry (D), 1975–1979
 Jerry A. Moore Jr. (R), 1975–1985
 Hilda Mason (Statehood), 1977–1999 (appointed by party and then won special election after death of Hobson)
 Betty Ann Kane (D), 1979–1991
 John L. Ray (D), 1979–1997 (appointed by party and then won special election after Barry became mayor)
 Carol Schwartz (R), 1985–1989
 William Lightfoot (I), 1989–1997
 Linda W. Cropp (D), 1991–1997
 Harold Brazil (D), 1997–2005
 Carol Schwartz (R), 1997–2009
 Arrington Dixon (D), 1997 (appointed by party after Cropp became chairman)
 David Catania (R; became I in 2004), 1997–2015 (won special election at end of Dixon's temporary appointment)
 Phil Mendelson (D), 1999–2012
 Kwame R. Brown (D), 2005–2011
 Michael A. Brown (I), 2009–2013
 Sekou Biddle (D), 2011 (appointed by party after Kwame Brown became chairman)
 Vincent Orange (D), 2011–2016 (won special election at end of Biddle's temporary appointment)
 Anita Bonds (D), 2012–present (appointed by party after Mendelson became chairman and later won a special election)
 David Grosso (I), 2013–2021
 Elissa Silverman (I), 2015–2023
 Robert White (D), 2016–present (appointed by party following the resignation of Vincent Orange)
 Christina Henderson (I), 2021–present
 Kenyan McDuffie (I), 2023–present

Ward 1 member
The Ward 1 member is elected in years divisible by 2 but not by 4: 1974, 1978, ..., 2010, 2014, etc.

 David A. Clarke (D), 1975–1983
 Frank Smith (D), 1983–1999
 Jim Graham (D), 1999–2015
 Brianne Nadeau (D), 2015–present

Ward 2 member
The Ward 2 member was elected in 1974 to a 2-year term and elected in years divisible by 4 thereafter: 1976, 1980, ..., 2008, 2012, etc.

 John A. Wilson (D), 1975–1991
 Jack Evans (D), 1991–2020 (won special election after Wilson became chairman, resigned in January 2020, due to ethics violations)
 Brooke Pinto (D), 2020–present (won special election after Evans resigned)

Ward 3 member
The Ward 3 member is elected in years divisible by 2 but not by 4: 1974, 1978, ..., 2010, 2014, etc.

 Polly Shackleton (D), 1975–1987
 James E. Nathanson (D), 1987–1995
 Kathleen Patterson (D), 1995–2007
 Mary Cheh (D), 2007–2023
 Matthew Frumin (D), 2023–present

Ward 4 member
The Ward 4 member was elected in 1974 to a 2-year term and elected in years divisible by 4 thereafter: 1976, 1980, ..., 2008, 2012, etc.

 Arrington Dixon (D), 1975–1979
 Charlene Drew Jarvis (D), 1979–2001 (won special election after Dixon became chairman)
 Adrian Fenty (D), 2001–2007
 Muriel Bowser (D), 2007–2015 (won special election after Fenty became mayor)
 Brandon Todd (D), 2015–2021 (won special election after Bowser became mayor)
 Janeese Lewis George (D), 2021–present

Ward 5 member
The Ward 5 member is elected in years divisible by 2 but not by 4: 1974, 1978, ..., 2010, 2014, etc.

 William Spaulding (D), 1975–1987
 Harry Thomas, Sr. (D), 1987–1999
 Vincent Orange (D), 1999–2007
 Harry Thomas, Jr. (D), 2007–2012 (resigned)
 Kenyan McDuffie  (D), 2012–2023 (won special election after Thomas' resignation)
 Zachary Parker (D), 2023–present

Ward 6 member
The Ward 6 member is elected in years divisible by 2 but not by 4: 1974, 1978, ..., 2010, 2014, etc.

 Nadine Winter (D), 1975–1991
 Harold Brazil (D), 1991–1997
 Sharon Ambrose (D), 1997–2007 (won special election after Brazil became at-large)
 Tommy Wells (D), 2007–2015
 Charles Allen (D), 2015–present

Ward 7 member
The Ward 7 member was elected in 1974 to a 2-year term and elected in years divisible by 4 thereafter: 1976, 1980, ..., 2008, 2012, etc.

 Willie Hardy (D), 1975–1981
 H. R. Crawford (D), 1981–1993
 Kevin P. Chavous (D), 1993–2005
 Vincent C. Gray (D), 2005–2007
 Yvette Alexander (D), 2007–2017 (won special election after Gray became chairman)
 Vincent C. Gray (D), 2017–present

Ward 8 member
The Ward 8 member was elected in 1974 to a 2-year term and elected in years divisible by 4 thereafter: 1976, 1980, ..., 2008, 2012, etc.

 James Coates (D), 1975–1977
 Wilhelmina Rolark (D), 1977–1993
 Marion Barry (D), 1993–1995
 Eydie Whittington (D), 1995–1997 (won special election after Barry became mayor)
 Sandy Allen (D), 1997–2005
 Marion Barry (D), 2005–2014
 LaRuby May (D), 2015–2017 (won special election after Barry died)
 Trayon White (D), 2017–present

Table
Background colors indicate party:

See also
 Council of the District of Columbia
 List of mayors of Washington, D.C.
 Political party strength in Washington, D.C.
 United States congressional delegations from the District of Columbia

References

External links

 District of Columbia Home Rule Act.
 

 
Council